Anthony Raymond Scruggs (born March 19, 1966 in Riverside, California) is a former Major League Baseball center fielder.

External links

1966 births
Living people
Baseball players from California
Mt. SAC Mounties baseball players
Texas Rangers players
Long Beach Barracudas players